Barun-Khasurta (Baruun Khasuurta) is a rural locality (an ulus) in Khorinsky District, Republic of Buryatia, Russia. The population was 237 as of 2010. There are 7 streets.

Geography 
Barun-Khasurta is located 56 km west of Khorinsk (the district's administrative centre) by road. Udinsk is the nearest rural locality.

References 

Rural localities in Khorinsky District